Hay was a railway station serving the town of Hay-on-Wye in Powys, Wales, although the station was located just across the English border in Herefordshire. Hay had one of the earliest railway stations in the country, being part of a horse-drawn tramway.

Railway lines from Hay station

The Hay Railway, a horse-worked freight tramroad, opened from the Brecon & Abergavenny Canal at Brecon to Hay on 7 May 1816. The line was opened from Hay to Clifford Castle on 30 July 1817. The line was not completed between The Lakes at Clifford and Eardisley until 1 December 1818 because of the problem of the river crossing at Whitney-on-Wye. The Hay Railway was sold in 1860 to the Hereford, Hay and Brecon Railway (HH&BR) which made use of parts of its route.

The HH&BR was a struggling local line, much of it built by Thomas Savin, contractor and builder of many Welsh lines. It was completed in 1864. Like most local lines it was eventually rescued by a larger company – not the Great Western Railway, in whose territory it might be thought to lie – but the Midland Railway, which used it and other lines which it acquired or had running powers over, to put together a through route from Birmingham to Swansea via Hereford, Brecon, the Neath and Brecon Railway and the Swansea Vale Railway.

The Golden Valley Railway, which had its northern junction at Hay and ran through the Golden Valley to Pontrilas, was built between 1876 and 1889, was closed down in 1898, and then rescued by the Great Western Railway in 1901. It survived as a passenger line until 1941 and goods until the 1950s.

The whole of the Hereford to Brecon line including Hay was closed on 31 December 1962 and completely dismantled by 1963.

See also 

 Hay Railway

References

 Trace the complete route on this Google Map
 Gallery
 Thomas Savin - railway engineer
 Herefordshire - Golden Valley Line
 Hay-on-Wye station on navigable 1949 O. S. map

Further reading

Disused railway stations in Powys
Former Midland Railway stations
Railway stations in Great Britain opened in 1864
Railway stations in Great Britain closed in 1962
1864 establishments in Wales
1962 disestablishments in Wales
Hay-on-Wye